Corus tubericollis is a species of beetle in the family Cerambycidae. It was described by Breuning in 1981.

References

tubericollis
Beetles described in 1981